The Head Hunter is a 1982 Hong Kong action film directed by Lau Shing-hon and starring Chow Yun-fat and Rosamund Kwan. The film is also known as Long Goodbye in the United States.

Plot summary 

Yuen Lik (Chow Yun Fat) is a Vietnam war veteran who becomes a hit man in Hong Kong. He later falls in love with Vickie Lee (Rosamund Kwan), a news reporter who's trying to solve the string of murders in the city.

Cast

Soundtrack

External links 

1982 films
1980s action thriller films
Hong Kong action thriller films
1980s Cantonese-language films
Films set in Hong Kong
Films shot in Hong Kong
Films set in Vietnam
Films about contract killing
1980s Hong Kong films